Willi Hartung (1915–1987) was a Swiss painter.

References
This article was initially translated from the German Wikipedia.

20th-century Swiss painters
Swiss male painters
1915 births
1987 deaths
20th-century Swiss male artists